William Cofer Casey (May 5, 1905 – January 1968), nicknamed "Mickey", was an American Negro league catcher between 1930 and 1942.

A native of Newport News, Virginia, Casey attended Johnson C. Smith University. He made his Negro leagues debut in 1930 with the Brooklyn Royal Giants and Baltimore Black Sox. Casey went on to play for several teams, including a six-year stretch with the Philadelphia Stars. He finished his career in 1942 with the Baltimore Elite Giants. Casey died in Philadelphia, Pennsylvania in 1968 at age 62.

References

External links
 and Baseball-Reference Black Baseball stats and Seamheads

1905 births
1968 deaths
Date of death missing
Baltimore Black Sox players
Baltimore Elite Giants players
Brooklyn Royal Giants players
New York Cubans players
Newark Eagles players
Philadelphia Stars players
Pittsburgh Crawfords players
Washington Black Senators players
Baseball catchers
Baseball players from Virginia
Sportspeople from Newport News, Virginia
20th-century African-American sportspeople